Reading Blaster 2000 is a remake of Reading Blaster: Invasion of the Word Snatchers created by Davidson & Associates in 1996. The game was later resold as Reading Blaster: Ages 6–9 in 1998 and, under Knowledge Adventure, as Reading Blaster for 3rd Grade in 2000. It is part of the Blaster Learning System series.

The game features a premise involving the characters depicted in previous Blaster products (Blasternaut, Galactic Commander and Spot) competing in The Challenge of the Reading Gladiators, a game show set in outer space. The user chooses which Blaster character to play and may either compete against a friend, playing another Blaster character, or the computer, in which case the player's opponent is Illitera, who was previously the main villain of the original Reading Blaster.

This is one of the few multiplayer video games in the Blaster series. It is also one of the few entries in the series to not have a plot involving foiling a villainous character's evil plan. Also in this game, Illitera becomes the only recurring villain in the Blaster games, although here she does nothing worse than bad-mouthing the show's hosts and eliciting boos from the unseen audience.

See also
 Math Blaster Episode I: In Search of Spot
 Math Blaster Episode II: Secret of the Lost City

External links
 SuperKids review

1996 video games
1998 video games
1999 video games
Windows games
Classic Mac OS games
Mathematical education video games
Children's educational video games
Video games developed in the United States
Multiplayer and single-player video games
Davidson & Associates games